Gerasimenko or Herasymenko (Герасименко) is a Ukrainian-language surname. It is a patronymic surname and is derived from the given name Gerasim.

The surname may refer to:

 Aleksei Gerasimenko (born 1970), Russian footballer
 Dmitry Gerasimenko (born 1978), Russian businessman
 Oleg Gerasimenko (born 1990),  Russian footballer
 Svetlana Gerasimenko (born 1945), Ukrainian-born Tajikistani astronomer
 Lina Herasymenko (born 1974), Ukrainian archer
 Vasyl Herasymenko (1900–1961), Soviet-Ukrainian general

See also
 
3945 Gerasimenko, an asteroid
67P/Churyumov–Gerasimenko, the comet visited by the Rosetta spacecraft

Ukrainian-language surnames
Patronymic surnames